The 2016 USC Trojans football team represented the University of Southern California in the 2016 NCAA Division I FBS football season. They played their home games at the Los Angeles Memorial Coliseum as part of the South Division of the Pac-12 Conference. They were led by head coach Clay Helton in his first full season after replacing Steve Sarkisian in the sixth game of the 2015 season. They finished the season 10–3, 7–2 in Pac-12 play to finish in second place in the South Division. They were invited to the Rose Bowl where they defeated Big Ten Conference champion Penn State.

Personnel

Coaching staff

Roster

Returning starters

USC returns 32 starters in 2016, including 17 on offense, 13 on defense, and two on special teams.

Key departures include Cody Kessler (QB – 14 games), Tre Madden (TB – 6 games), Jahleel Pinner (FB – 4 games), Max Tuerk (C – 5 games), Antwaun Woods (NT – 13 games), Delvon Simmons (DT – 14 games), Greg Townsend Jr. (DE – 13 games), Claude Pelon (DE – 2 games), Su'a Cravens (LB – 14 games), Scott Felix (LB – 10 games), Anthony Sarao (LB – 13 games), Lamar Dawson (LB – 1 game), Kevon Seymour (CB – 4 games), Alex Wood (K – 13 games), Kris Albarado (P – 14 games).

Other departures include Soma Vainuku (FB),  Connor Spears (TE).

Offense (17)

Defense (13)

Special teams (2)

Depth chart

Official Depth Chart 2016

True Freshman
Double Position : *

Recruiting class

Scholarship distribution chart 

 /  / * : Former walk-on

– 85 scholarships permitted, 79 currently allotted to players. (Note: Max Browne, E.J. Price, Noah Jefferson, Jabari Ruffin & Scott Felix is still "counts" for 2016, bringing the total to 84).

– .

– USC can sign 25 players in the class of 2017.

2016 NFL Draft

Schedule

Game summaries

Alabama

   (Q1, 12:33) USC – #39 Matt Boermeester 47 yard Field Goal – USC 3–0
   (Q2, 7:54) ALA – #13 ArDarius Stewart 39 yard pass from #2 Jalen Hurts (#99 Adam Griffith kick) – ALA 7–3
   (Q2, 3:30) ALA – #99 Adam Griffith 29 yard Field Goal – ALA 10–3
   (Q2, 2:48) ALA – #26 Marlon Humphrey 18 yard interception return (#99 Adam Griffith kick) – ALA 17–3
   (Q3, 13:53) ALA – #13 ArDarius Stewart 71 yard pass from #2 Jalen Hurts (#99 Adam Griffith kick) – ALA 24–3
   (Q3, 11:01) ALA – #2 Jalen Hurts 7 yard run, (#99 Adam Griffith kick) – ALA 31–3
   (Q3, 6:00) ALA – #2 Jalen Hurts 6 yard run, (#99 Adam Griffith kick) – ALA 38–3
   (Q3, 2:38) USC – #39 Matt Boermeester 41 yard Field Goal – ALA 38–6
   (Q4, 13:16) ALA – #9 Bo Scarbrough 6 yard run, (#99 Adam Griffith kick) – ALA 45–6
   (Q4, 9:34) ALA – #14 Gehrig Dieter 45 yard pass from #8 Blake Barnett (#99 Adam Griffith kick) – ALA 52–6

Utah State

   (Q1, 11:55) USC – #9 JuJu Smith-Schuster 3 yard pass from #4 Max Browne, (#39 Matt Boermeester kick) – USC 7–0
   (Q2, 8:08) USC – #80 Deontay Burnett 13 yard pass from #14 Sam Darnold, (#39 Matt Boermeester kick) – USC 14–0
   (Q2, 0:24) USC – #7 Steven Mitchell 2 yard pass from #4 Max Browne, (#39 Matt Boermeester kick) – USC 21–0
   (Q3, 6:43) USC – #39 Matt Boermeester 20 yard Field Goal – USC 24–0
   (Q3, 4:06) USC – #2 Adoree' Jackson 77 yard punt return (#39 Matt Boermeester kick) – USC 31–0
   (Q3, 0:01) UTS – #83 Wyatt Houston 6 yard pass from #2 Kent Myers, (#63 Brock Warren kick) – USC 31–7
   (Q4, 9:50) USC – #9 JuJu Smith-Schuster 15 yard pass from #14 Sam Darnold, (#39 Matt Boermeester kick) – USC 38–7
   (Q4, 2:48) USC – #28 Aca'Cedric Ware 2 yard run, (#39 Matt Boermeester kick) – USC 45–7

Stanford

   (Q1, 4:30) STA – #5 Christian McCaffrey 56 yard pass from #17 Ryan Burns, (#34 Conrad Ukropina kick) – STA 7–0
   (Q1, 0:31) USC – #39 Matt Boermeester 47 yard Field Goal – STA 7–3
   (Q2, 9:34) STA – #34 Conrad Ukropina 31 yard Field Goal – STA 10–3
   (Q2, 2:14) STA – #5 Christian McCaffrey 1 yard run – STA 17–3
   (Q3, 11:35) USC – #25 Ronald Jones II 1 yard run, (#39 Matt Boermeester kick) – STA 17–10
   (Q3, 5:46) STA – #34 Conrad Ukropina 42 yard Field Goal – STA 20–10
   (Q3, 3:37) STA – #3 Michael Rector 56 yard run, (#34 Conrad Ukropina kick)  – STA 27–10

Utah

   (Q1, 7:26) UTA – #3 Troy Williams 10 yard run, (#39 Andy Phillips kick) – UTA 7–0
   (Q1, 7:19) USC – #2 Adoree' Jackson 100 yard kick return (#39 Matt Boermeester kick) – USC 7–7
   (Q2, 6:48) UTA – #39 Andy Phillips 36 yard Field Goal – UTA 10–7
   (Q2, 4:48) USC – #22 Justin Davis 14 yard run, (#39 Matt Boermeester kick) – USC 14–10
   (Q2, 0:40) USC – #39 Matt Boermeester 32 yard Field Goal – USC 17–10
   (Q3, 9:54) USC – #14 Sam Darnold 8 yard run, (#39 Matt Boermeester kick) – USC 24–10
   (Q3, 5:02) UTA – #54 Isaac Asiata recovered fumble, (#39 Andy Phillips kick) – USC 24–17
   (Q4, 15:00) USC – #39 Matt Boermeester 43 yard Field Goal – USC 27–17
   (Q4, 9:54) UTA – #11 Raelon Singleton 11 yard pass from #3 Troy Williams, (#39 Andy Phillips kick) – USC 27–24
   (Q4, 0:16) UTA – #12 Tim Patrick 11 yard pass from #3 Troy Williams, (#39 Andy Phillips kick) – UTA 31–27

Arizona State

   (Q1, 10:00) ASU – #5 Zane Gonzalez 40 yard Field Goal – ASU 3–0
   (Q1, 4:38) USC – #9 JuJu Smith-Schuster 5 yard pass from #14 Sam Darnold, (#39 Matt Boermeester kick) – USC 7–3
   (Q1, 0:45) ASU – #5 Zane Gonzalez 34 yard Field Goal – USC 7–6
   (Q2, 10:03) USC – #9 JuJu Smith-Schuster 3 yard pass from #14 Sam Darnold, (#39 Matt Boermeester kick) – USC 14–6
   (Q2, 4:45) USC – #39 Matt Boermeester 49 yard Field Goal – USC 17–6
   (Q2, 2:41) USC – #22 Justin Davis 37 yard run, (#39 Matt Boermeester kick) – USC 24–6
   (Q2, 0:25) USC – #39 Matt Boermeester 46 yard Field Goal – USC 27–6
   (Q3, 11:27) USC – #9 JuJu Smith-Schuster 67 yard pass from #14 Sam Darnold, (#39 Matt Boermeester kick) – USC 34–6
   (Q3, 8:27) USC – #14 Sam Darnold 3 yard run, (#39 Matt Boermeester kick) – USC 41–6
   (Q4, 8:45) ASU – #80 Raymond Epps 13 yard pass from #2 Brady White, (#5 Zane Gonzalez kick) – USC 41–13
   (Q4, 2:00) ASU – #22 Nick Ralston 10 yard run, (#5 Zane Gonzalez kick) – USC 41–20

Colorado

   (Q1, 3:38) USC – #88 Daniel Imatorbhebhe 32 yard pass from #14 Sam Darnold, (#39 Matt Boermeester kick) – USC 7–0
   (Q2, 3:54) USC – #82 Tyler Petite 11 yard pass from #14 Sam Darnold, (#39 Matt Boermeester kick) – USC 14–0
   (Q3, 11:34) COL – #23 Phillip Lindsay 67 yard pass from #4 Bryce Bobo, (#49 Davis Price kick) – USC 14–7
   (Q4, 10:26) COL – #4 Bryce Bobo 12 yard pass from #12 Steven Montez, (#49 Davis Price kick) – USC 14–14
   (Q4, 8:34) USC – #82 Tyler Petite 8 yard pass from #14 Sam Darnold, (#39 Matt Boermeester kick) – USC 21–14
   (Q4, 4:55) COL – #49 Davis Price 42 yard Field Goal – USC 21–17

Arizona

   (Q1, 10:34) USC – #25 Ronald Jones II 5 yard run, (#39 Matt Boermeester kick) – USC 7–0
   (Q1, 5:44) ARI – #14 Khalil Tate 3 yard run, (#30 Josh Pollack kick) – USC 7–7
   (Q1, 0:13) USC – #80 Deontay Burnett 11 yard pass from #14 Sam Darnold, (#39 Matt Boermeester kick) – USC 14–7
   (Q2, 13:50) USC – #88 Daniel Imatorbhebhe 32 yard pass from #14 Sam Darnold, (#39 Matt Boermeester kick) – USC 21–7
   (Q2, 4:14) USC – #9 JuJu Smith-Schuster 3 yard pass from #14 Sam Darnold – USC 27–7
   (Q2, 0:34) USC – #9 JuJu Smith-Schuster 39 yard pass from #14 Sam Darnold, (#39 Matt Boermeester kick) – USC 34–7
   (Q3, 10:37) USC – #9 JuJu Smith-Schuster 46 yard pass from #14 Sam Darnold, (#39 Matt Boermeester kick) – USC 41–7
   (Q4, 13:16) ARI – #10 Samajie Grant 7 yard pass from #15 Matt Morin, (#30 Josh Pollack kick) – USC 41–14
   (Q4, 11:38) USC – #28 Aca'Cedric Ware 21 yard run, (#39 Matt Boermeester kick) – USC 48–7

California

   (Q1, 10:00) USC – #1 Darreus Rogers 3 yard pass from #14 Sam Darnold, (#39 Matt Boermeester kick) – USC 7–0
   (Q1, 4:34) USC – #25 Ronald Jones II 16 yard pass from #14 Sam Darnold, (#39 Matt Boermeester kick) – USC 14–0
   (Q2, 12:13) USC – #80 Deontay Burnett 13 yard pass from #14 Sam Darnold, (#39 Matt Boermeester kick) – USC 21–0
   (Q2, 08:04) CAL – #5 Tre Watson 22 yard pass from #7 Davis Webb, (#9 Matt Anderson kick) – USC 21–7
   (Q2, 1:54) CAL – #9 Matt Anderson 27 yard Field Goal – USC 21–10
   (Q2, 0:35) USC – #1 Darreus Rogers 20 yard pass from #14 Sam Darnold, (#39 Matt Boermeester kick) – USC 28–10
   (Q3, 9:25) CAL – #7 Davis Webb 1 yard run, (#9 Matt Anderson kick) – USC 28–17
   (Q3, 7:10) USC – #25 Ronald Jones II 37 yard run, (#39 Matt Boermeester kick) – USC 35–17
   (Q3, 1:18) USC – #88 Daniel Imatorbhebhe 17 yard pass from #14 Sam Darnold, (#39 Matt Boermeester kick) – USC 42–17
   (Q4, 13:22) CAL – #1 Melquise Stovall 16 yard pass from #7 Davis Webb, (#9 Matt Anderson kick) – USC 42–24
   (Q4, 2:42) USC – #39 Matt Boermeester 32 yard Field Goal – USC 45–24

Oregon

   (Q1, 12:18) USC – #39 Matt Boermeester 35 yard Field Goal – USC 3–0
   (Q1, 8:37) USC – #25 Ronald Jones II 23 yard run, (#39 Matt Boermeester kick) – USC 10–0
   (Q1, 5:25) USC – #25 Ronald Jones II 3 yard run, (#39 Matt Boermeester kick) – USC 17–0
   (Q1, 0:15) ORE – #6 Charles Nelson 25 yard run – USC 17–6
   (Q2, 0:30) USC – #80 Deontay Burnett 3 yard pass from #14 Sam Darnold, (#39 Matt Boermeester kick) – USC 24–6
   (Q3, 13:51) USC – #25 Ronald Jones II 66 yard run, (#39 Matt Boermeester kick) – USC 31–6
   (Q3, 9:57) ORE – #85 Pharaoh Brown 5 yard pass from #10 Justin Herbert, (#41 Aidan Schneider kick) – USC 31–13
   (Q3, 2:47) USC – #48 Taylor McNamara 8 yard pass from #14 Sam Darnold, (#39 Matt Boermeester kick) – USC 38–13
   (Q4, 11:42) USC – #25 Ronald Jones II 1 yard run, (#39 Matt Boermeester kick) – USC 45–13
   (Q4, 5:41) ORE – #9 Dakota Prukop 15 yard run, (#41 Aidan Schneider kick) – USC 45–20

Washington

   (Q1, 4:03) WASH – #48 Cameron Van Winkle 43 yard Field Goal – WASH 3–0
   (Q1, 0:46) USC – #39 Matt Boermeester 38 yard Field Goal – USC 3–3
   (Q2, 9:00) USC – #1 Darreus Rogers 13 yard pass from #14 Sam Darnold, (#39 Matt Boermeester kick) – USC 10–3
   (Q2, 2:39) WASH – #48 Cameron Van Winkle 39 yard Field Goal – USC 10–6
   (Q2, 0:34) USC – #25 Ronald Jones II 4 yard run, (#39 Matt Boermeester kick) – USC 17–6
   (Q3, 8:33) USC – #1 John Ross 70 yard pass from #3 Jake Browning, (#48 Cameron Van Winkle kick) – USC 17–13
   (Q4, 13:39) USC – #88 Daniel Imatorbhebhe 8 yard pass from #14 Sam Darnold, (#39 Matt Boermeester kick) – USC 24–13
   (Q4, 0:58) USC – Team Safety – USC 26–13

UCLA

   (Q1, 13:41) UCLA – #2 Jordan Lasley 56 yard pass from #12 Mike Fafaul, (#17 JJ Molson kick) – UCLA 7–0
   (Q1, 9:54) USC – #25 Ronald Jones II 1 yard run, (#39 Matt Boermeester kick) – USC 7–7
   (Q2, 13:34) UCLA – #2 Jordan Lasley 7 yard pass from #12 Mike Fafaul, (#17 JJ Molson kick) – UCLA 14–7
   (Q2, 11:19) USC – #25 Ronald Jones II 60 yard run, (#39 Matt Boermeester kick) – USC 14–14
   (Q2, 8:18) USC – #13 De'Quan Hampton 31 yard pass from #14 Sam Darnold – USC 20–14
   (Q2, 0:12) USC – #39 Matt Boermeester 30 yard Field Goal – USC 23–14
   (Q3, 10:01) USC – #13 De'Quan Hampton 6 yard pass from #14 Sam Darnold, (#39 Matt Boermeester kick)  – USC 30–14
   (Q4, 13:38) USC – #39 Matt Boermeester 32 yard Field Goal – USC 33–14
   (Q4, 7:01) USC – #39 Matt Boermeester 25 yard Field Goal – USC 36–14

Notre Dame

 (Q1, 10:22) USC – #39 Matt Boermeester 37 yard Field Goal USC 3–0
 (Q1, 9:51) ND – #14 DeShone Kizer 1 Yd Run (Justin Yoon Kick) ND 7–3
 (Q1, 7:08) USC – #25 Ronald Jones II 51 yard run, (#39 Matt Boermeester kick) USC 10–7
 (Q2, 1:24) USC – #2 Adoree' Jackson 55 Yd Punt Return (Matt Boermeester Kick) USC 17–7
 (Q2, 1:07) USC – #27 Ajene Harris 33 Yd Interception Return (Matt Boermeester Kick) USC 24–7
 (Q3, 10:08) ND – #10 Chris Finke 14 Yd pass from DeShone Kizer (Justin Yoon Kick) USC 24–14
 (Q3, 7:41) USC – #2 Adoree' Jackson 52 Yd pass from Sam Darnold (Matt Boermeester Kick) USC 31–14
 (Q3, 1:41) ND – #29 Kevin Stepherson 29 Yd pass from DeShone Kizer (Justin Yoon Kick) USC 31–21
 (Q3, 0:47) USC – #2 Adoree' Jackson 97 Yd Kickoff Return (Matt Boermeester Kick) USC 38–21 
 (Q4, 9:40) USC – #9 Juju Smith-Schuster 2 Yd pass from Sam Darnold (Matt Boermeester Kick) USC 45–21
 (Q4, 1:02) ND –  #6 Equanimeous St. Brown 15 Yd pass from Malik Zaire (Two-Point Run Conversion Failed) USC 45–27

Penn State (Rose Bowl)

 (Q1, 10:39) USC – #80 Deontay Burnett 26 yard pass from #14 Sam Darnold, (#39 Matt Boermeester kick) – USC 7–0
 (Q1, 4:46) USC – #39 Matt Boermeester 22 yard Field Goal – USC 10–0
 (Q1, 9:26) USC – #39 Matt Boermeester 44 yard Field Goal – USC 13–0
 (Q2, 11:50) PSU – #26 Saquon Barkley 24 yard run, (#95 Tyler Davis kick) – USC 13–7
 (Q2, 10:15) USC – #80 Deontay Burnett 3 yard pass from #14 Sam Darnold, (#39 Matt Boermeester kick) – USC 20–7
 (Q2, 8:49) PSU – #12 Chris Godwin 30 yard pass from #9 Trace McSorley, (#95 Tyler Davis kick) – USC 20–14
 (Q2, 6:20) USC – #1 Darreus Rogers 3 yard pass from #14 Sam Darnold, (#39 Matt Boermeester kick) – USC 27–14
 (Q2, 1:00) PSU – #88 Mike Gesicki 11 yard pass from #9 Trace McSorley, (#95 Tyler Davis kick) – USC 27–21
 (Q3, 13:22) PSU – #26 Saquon Barkley 79 yard run, (#95 Tyler Davis kick) – PSU 28–27
 (Q3, 11:38) PSU – #12 Chris Godwin 72 yard pass from #9 Trace McSorley, (#95 Tyler Davis kick) – PSU 35–27
 (Q3, 10:31) PSU – #9 Trace McSorley 3 yard run, (#95 Tyler Davis kick) – PSU 42–27
 (Q3, 6:54) USC – #9 JuJu Smith-Schuster 13 yard pass from #14 Sam Darnold, (2pts Good) – PSU 42–35
 (Q3, 2:00) PSU – #26 Saquon Barkley 7 yard pass from #9 Trace McSorley, (#95 Tyler Davis kick) – PSU 49–35
 (Q4, 8:19) USC – #4 Ronald Jones II 3 yard run, (#39 Matt Boermeester kick) – PSU 49–42
 (Q4, 1:27) USC – #80 Deontay Burnett 27 yard pass from #14 Sam Darnold, (#39 Matt Boermeester kick) – USC 49–49
 (Q4, 0:00) USC – #39 Matt Boermeester 46 yard Field Goal – USC 52–49

Rankings

Statistics

Team

As of November 20, 2016.

Non-conference opponents

Pac-12 opponents

Offense

Defense

Key: POS: Position, SOLO: Solo Tackles, AST: Assisted Tackles, TOT: Total Tackles, TFL: Tackles-for-loss, SACK: Quarterback Sacks, INT: Interceptions, BU: Passes Broken Up, PD: Passes Defended, QBH: Quarterback Hits, FR: Fumbles Recovered, FF: Forced Fumbles, BLK: Kicks or Punts Blocked, SAF: Safeties, TD : Touchdown

Special teams

Awards and honors

Coaches
Clay Helton – Head Coach
Paul "Bear" Bryant Award (Coach of the Year) : Finalist
 FWAA First Year Coach of Year

Offense
Sam Darnold – QB –  Freshman
Archie Griffin Award (most valuable player) : Winner
 Pac-12 Offensive Freshman of the Year
Manning Award (quarterback) : Finalist
Davey O'Brien Award (quarterback) : Semi-Finalist

JuJu Smith-Schuster – WR – Junior
POLY POY (Polynesian College Football Player of the Year) : Finalist

Defense
Adoree' Jackson – CB – Junior
Jim Thorpe Award (defensive back) : Winner
 Pac-12 Defensive Player of The Year
Paul Hornung Award (most versatile player) : Finalist

College Sports Madness All-American Team

First Team
Zach Banner – OT – Senior (164th)
Adoree' Jackson – CB – Junior (165th)

Third Team
Adoree' Jackson – KR & PR – Junior

All-Pac-12 Individual Awards 
Offensive Freshman of the Year
Sam Darnold – QB –  Freshman

Defensive Player of the Year
Adoree' Jackson – CB – Junior

PAC-12 All-Conference Team
First Team
Zach Banner – OT – Senior
Chad Wheeler – OT – Senior
Adoree' Jackson – CB & PR – Junior

Second Team
Ronald Jones II – TB – Sophomore
JuJu Smith-Schuster – WR – Junior
Damien Mama – OG – Junior
Stevie Tu'ikolovatu – DT – Senior
Cameron Smith – ILB – Sophomore

Honorable Mention
Sam Darnold – QB –  Freshman
Darreus Rogers – WR – Senior
Daniel Imatorbhebhe – TE –  Freshman
Rasheem Green – DT – Sophomore
Porter Gustin – DE – Sophomore
Michael Hutchings – ILB – Senior
Iman Marshall – CB – Sophomore
Chris Hawkins – S – Junior
Leon McQuay III – S – Senior

PAC-12 All-Freshman Team
First Team
Sam Darnold – QB –  Freshman
Daniel Imatorbhebhe – TE –  Freshman

PAC-12 All-Academic Team
Honorable Mention
Sam Darnold – QB –  Freshman
Max Browne – QB –  Junior
Matt Boermeester – K –  Junior
Chris Tilbey – P –  Sophomore

USA Today Sports Freshman All-America Team
Second Team
Adoree' Jackson – RET – Junior

FWAA Freshman All-America Team
Sam Darnold – QB –  Freshman

Notes
 January 4, 2016 – Tyson Helton, Neil Callaway Officially Join USC Football Staff.
 January 4, 2016 – Keanu Saleapaga De-Commits from USC Football.
 January 8, 2016 – John Baxter Returns to Coach USC Special Teams.
 January 10, 2016 – Marques Tuiasosopo Leaves USC to be UCLA QB Coach.
 January 11, 2016 – USC Officially Hires Defensive Coordinator Clancy Pendergast.
 January 12, 2016 – Peter Sirmon Leaving USC to be Mississippi State DC.
 January 14, 2016 – USC hires Ronnie Bradford to Coach Defensive Backs.
 January 18, 2016 – Tommie Robinson returning to USC to Coach Tailbacks and Run Game Coordinator.
 January 22, 2016 – Connor Spears Steps Away From USC Football Team.
 January 22, 2016 – Velus Jones flips from USC to Oklahoma.
 January 23, 2016 – Velus Jones Announces Re-Commitment to USC from Oklahoma.
 January 23, 2016 – Keyshon Camp De-Commits From USC.
 January 26, 2016 – Kenechi Udeze Hired as USC Defensive Line Coach.
 February 3, 2016 – Jack Jones Commits to USC Football on Signing Day.
 February 3, 2016 – USC Finishes With Top 10 Signing Day 2016 Recruiting Class.
 February 4, 2016 – Tee Martin Named 247Sports 2016 Recruiter of the Year.
 February 5, 2016 – QB Matt Corral Commits for 2018.
 February 12, 2016 – USC to NFL: Seven Trojans Invited to 2016 NFL Combine.
 March 2, 2016 – Caleb Wilson to Transfer From USC to UCLA.
 March 26, 2016 – USC Football: Kenny Bigelow Has Torn ACL, Will Miss 2016 Season.
 April 1, 2016 – Scott Felix Loses NCAA Appeal, Ending USC Football Career.
 April 5, 2016 – Thomas Graham De-Commits From USC.
 April 6, 2016 – Bo Calvert Commits to the Trojans.
 April 8, 2016 – LB Raymond Scott Commits to Trojans for 2018.
 April 13, 2016 – USC Hires Lynn Swann as New Athletic Director.
 April 22, 2016 – USC Football Players Rap While Stuck in an Elevator (Video).
 April 23, 2016 – Juliano Falaniko Commits to Trojans.
 May 19, 2016 – 3-Star LB Daniel Green Commits.
 May 19, 2016 – USC Football Boasts Most Wins Over Ranked Opponents In CFB.
 June 8, 2016 – Nation's No. 2 Center Commits to USC over Michigan.
 June 10, 2016 – Andrew Vorhees Commits to 2017 USC Recruiting Class.
 June 14, 2016 – USC Offensive Line is Nation's 2nd Most Experienced.
 June 16, 2016 – Utah Defensive Tackle Steve Tu’ikolovatu Transfers To USC Football.
 June 17, 2016 – Three Future Contests With Fresno State Announced.
 June 20, 2016 – C.J. Miller, 3-Star Safety, Commits to USC Football.
 June 27, 2016 – Erik Krommenhoek, 3-Star TE, Commits to USC Football.
 July 3, 2016 – Adoree’ Jackson Doesn't Qualify for 2016 Olympic Games in Rio.
 July 11, 2016 – 5 Trojans Make SI's Top 100 College Football Players of 2016.
 July 11, 2016 – New USC Football Jerseys Unveiled for 2016 Season.
 July 12, 2016 – USC vs. Alabama: Trojans to Wear White as Designated Road Team.
 July 13, 2016 – Unwrapping the New 2016 USC Football Media Guide.
 July 15, 2016 – Bubba Bolden Decommitted From USC Recruiting Class.
 July 19, 2016 – Isaiah Langley Suspended for USC vs. Alabama.
 July 21, 2016 – USC Football Picture Day 2016: Photos, Videos and New Jerseys.
 July 30, 2016 – Wylan Free Commits to 2017 USC Recruiting Class.
 August 2, 2016 – USC Football Ranks No. 5 In All-Time AP Poll.
 August 3, 2016 – Juwan Burgess, 3-Star ATH, Commits to USC Football.
 August 4, 2016 – USC Football Announces Stevie Tu’ikolovatu, 5 New Players for 2016.
 August 5, 2016 – Alijah Vera-Tucker Commits to 2017 USC Recruiting Class.
 August 5, 2016 – Hunter Echols Commits to 2017 USC Recruiting Class.
 August 10, 2016 – Freshman Vavae Malepeai Out 6–8 Weeks.
 August 16, 2016 – Projecting 2016 Starting Lineup After Fall Camp.
 August 16, 2016 – Jacob Lichtenstein, 3-Star DE, Commits to USC Football.
 August 17, 2016 – Tyson Helton and a New Look for USC Offense in 2016.
 August 18, 2016 – Matt Lopes, Reuben Peters, James Toland Awarded Scholarships.
 August 20, 2016 – Max Browne Named USC Starting Quarterback.
 August 20, 2016 – James Lynch, 3-Star DT, Commits To USC Football.
 August 21, 2016 – USC Football Ranked No. 20 In Preseason AP Poll.
 August 21, 2016 – Clay Helton Releases First USC Depth Chart of 2016.
 August 29, 2016 – LB Osa Masina Suspended For Season Opener.
 August 31, 2016 – 2016 USC Football Team Captains Announced.
 September 2, 2016 – Don Hill Sent Home Before USC vs Alabama Game.
 September 3, 2016 – USC vs Alabama Score and Recap: Tide Roll Big Over Trojans.
 September 4, 2016 – Jabari Ruffin Suspended For 1st Half vs Utah State.
 September 6, 2016 – USC Football Drops Out of AP Poll After Alabama Loss.
 September 8, 2016 – Toa Lobendahn Tears ACL Again, Out For Season.
 September 10, 2016 – USC vs Utah Score: Trojans Win Big in Home Opener.
 September 11, 2016 – Chuma Edoga Avoids Suspension For USC vs Stanford.
 September 12, 2016 – Adoree’ Jackson Named Pac-12 Special Teams Player of the Week.
 September 13, 2016 – Osa Masina, Don Hill Suspended From All USC Football Team Activities.
 September 15, 2016 – USC Football Should Use Adoree’ Jackson To Stop Christian McCaffrey.
 September 17, 2016 – USC vs Stanford Final Score: Cardinal Cruise to Victory.
 September 19, 2016 – Sam Darnold Named USC Starting Quarterback vs. Utah.
 September 19, 2016 – Clay Helton's USC Quarterback Change Put Max Browne Out to Dry.
 September 19, 2016 – Clay Helton Picked Sam Darnold as USC Quarterback Too Late.
 September 20, 2016 – Osa Masina, Don Hill Removed From USC Football Roster.
 September 20, 2016 – Freshman EJ Price to Transfer From USC Football Team.
 September 23, 2016 – USC vs Utah Final Score and Recap: Trojans Collapse in Salt Lake.
 September 24, 2016 – USC Football Mistakes From Top To Bottom Exposed vs Utah.
 September 24, 2016 – Justin Davis Joins USC's Illustrious 2,000-Yard Club.
 September 24, 2016 – Clay Helton, USC Need an Unthinkable Turnaround After 1–3 Start.
 September 27, 2016 – Noah Jefferson To Be Held Out Until November.
 October 1, 2016 – USC vs ASU Final Score: Trojans Win a Blowout.
 October 8, 2016 – USC vs Colorado Final Score: Trojans Survive To Down Buffaloes.
 October 14, 2016 – USC Football Has Reason To Look Forward After Back-To-Back Wins.
 October 15, 2016 – USC vs Arizona Score: Trojans Roll Wildcats in a Blowout.
 October 16, 2016 – Steven Mitchell Jr. Out For Season With ACL Tear.
 October 24, 2016 – Adoree’ Jackson Named 2016 Thorpe Award Semifinalist.
 October 27, 2016 – USC vs Cal Score: Trojans Roll Over Bears At Coliseum.
 November 1, 2016 – Max Browne Granted Permission To Seek Transfer From USC Football.
 November 5, 2016 – USC vs Oregon Score: Trojans Blow Out the Ducks.
 November 6, 2016 – Defense Comes Full Circle in Shutdown of Oregon Ducks.
 November 8, 2016 – USC Football Ranked No. 20 In College Football Playoff Rankings.
 November 10, 2016 – Sam Darnold Named Semifinalist for Davey O’Brien Award.
 November 12, 2016 – Redemption on the Line for Clay Helton, USC Football vs. Washington.
 November 12, 2016 – USC vs Washington: Lee Corso Picks Huskies On College Gameday.
 November 12, 2016 – USC vs Washington Score: Trojans Topple the No. 4 Huskies.
 November 13, 2016 – QB Jack Sears Commits To 2017 USC Recruiting Class, Flips From Duke.
 November 13, 2016 – It's Time To Give Clay Helton, USC Football Their Due Praise.
 November 14, 2016 – Sam Darnold Named Pac-12 Player of the Week After USC Win Over UW.
 November 15, 2016 – Clay Helton's USC Football Pulls Massive Upset In Seattle.
 November 15, 2016 – USC Football Jumps To No. 13 In College Football Playoff Rankings.
 November 17, 2016 – Adoree’ Jackson Named Finalist For 2016 Paul Hornung Award.
 November 19, 2016 – USC vs UCLA Score: Trojans Rout Bruins For 7th Straight Win.
 November 20, 2016 – USC Blowout of UCLA Fueled By Pete Carroll Style Run.
 November 21, 2016 – Adoree’ Jackson Named Finalist For Thorpe Award.
 November 22, 2016 – Juju Smith-Schuster Named Finalist For Polynesian Player Of The Year Award.
 November 22, 2016 – USC Football Moves Up To No. 12 In College Football Playoff Ranking.
 November 26, 2016 – Colorado Beats Utah, USC Football Falls Short Of Pac-12 South Title.
 November 26, 2016 – USC vs Notre Dame Score: Trojans Beat Irish, Win 8th-Straight Game.
 November 28, 2016 – Two Return TDs Earn Adoree’ Jackson Pac-12 Player Of The Week Honors.
 November 29, 2016 – Adoree’ Jackson, Sam Darnold Lead USC's 2016 All-Pac-12 Honors.
 November 29, 2016 – Noah Jefferson Reportedly Transferring From USC Football.
 November 29, 2016 – USC Football Up To No. 11 In College Football Playoff Rankings.
 November 30, 2016 – USC's Sam Darnold Named Finalist For 2016 Manning Award.
 November 30, 2016 – Adoree’ Jackson Named Finalist For Lott IMPACT Trophy.
 December 1, 2016 – Former USC RB Joe McKnight Killed in New Orleans at 28.
 December 4, 2016 – USC Football Ranked No. 9 In Week 15 AP Poll.
 December 4, 2016 – 2017 Rose Bowl Odds: USC Favored Over Penn State.
 December 5, 2016 – Juju Smith-Schuster Teases Return For Senior Season At USC.
 December 5, 2016 – Adoree’ Jackson Snubbed From Heisman Trophy Finalists.
 December 5, 2016 – 3-Star LB Daniel Green De-Commits.
 December 7, 2016 – Adoree’ Jackson, Zach Banner Named First Team All-Americans.
 December 8, 2016 – Adoree’ Jackson Says USC Comeback “Really On The Table”.
 December 8, 2016 – Adoree’ Jackson Wins 2016 Jim Thorpe Award.
 December 8, 2016 – 3-Star CB Wylan Free De-Commits.
 December 10, 2016 – James Lynch De-Commits from 2017 USC Recruiting Class.
 December 10, 2016 – Marcus Johnson Commits to 2018 USC Recruiting Class.
 December 11, 2016 – Juju Smith-Schuster To Announce NFL Decision After Rose Bowl.
 December 11, 2016 – What if Adoree’ Jackson and Juju Smith-Schuster Returned to USC in 2017?.
 December 12, 2016 – Top 10 USC Football Players of 2016.
 December 12, 2016 – Adoree’ Jackson Earns Consensus All-American Honors.
 December 13, 2016 – Jalen Greene To Serve As Back Up QB For Rose Bowl.
 December 13, 2016 – USC Injury Report: Jonathan Lockett To Undergo Season-Ending Surgery.
 December 14, 2016 – USC's Adoree’ Jackson Earns Unanimous All-American Honors.
 December 14, 2016 – Clay Helton Named Finalist For Bear Bryant Coach Of The Year Award.
 December 14, 2016 – USC Football Awards 2016: Adoree’ Jackson Repeats As Team MVP.
 December 14, 2016 – USC Injury Report: Nathan Smith Tears ACL.
 December 15, 2016 – USC Football Is Back In The Rose Bowl and Back On Track.
 December 15, 2016 – Former USC QB Max Browne to Transfer to Pitt.
 December 15, 2016 – Tayler Katoa Commits to 2017 USC Recruiting Class.
 December 16, 2016 – USC Left Tackle Chad Wheeler Named First Team All-American.
 December 17, 2016 – Zach Banner's All-American Nod Pays Off USC Career In Tumultuous Era.
 December 19, 2016 – USC OT Zach Banner Accepts Invitation To 2017 Reese's Senior Bowl.
 December 20, 2016 – USC NFL: Three Trojans Make 2017 Pro Bowl.
 December 22, 2016 – Terrance Lang Commits to 2017 USC Recruiting Class.
 December 22, 2016 – Sam Darnold, Daniel Imatorbhebhe Named to Athlon All-Freshman Team.
 December 27, 2016 – Olajuwon Tucker, Kevin Scott Academically Ineligible for 2017 Rose Bowl.
 December 28, 2016 – Penn State Suspends Two Players for 2017 Rose Bowl vs. USC.
 December 28, 2016 – Long snapper Johnson becomes part of 2017 class.
 December 29, 2016 – USC Football Sending Four Players to East-West Shrine Game.
 December 30, 2016 –  Khaliel Rodgers To Transfer Away From USC Football.

References

USC
USC Trojans football seasons
Rose Bowl champion seasons
USC Trojans football
USC Trojans football